Bhramanam is an Indian Malayalam television series written by novelist Joyce which is an adaptation of his novel on Malayala Manorama. The show depicts the story of Anitha who represents mom's who guide their children onto the right path.

It is premiered on Mazhavil Manorama on 12 February 2018.

Plot
The show is a family drama. Harilal, a bank employee working with Bank of Baroda in Delhi and Anitha, a nurse working in AIIMS, Delhi are caught in a web of love and are happily married and are blessed with two daughters whom they named Haritha and Neetha. In time, the couple faces troubles in their life together which made them get divorced and the daughters remain with their father. Sixteen years after their divorce, Anitha is back with her family. Harilal seeks the help of Anitha to look after the late fiancé's daughter. Anitha started to feel strongly endeared towards her daughters and she must decide whether to rejoin her family and continue living a happy life together. Anitha helps Haritha and Neetha in every dangerous situation they face. Haritha and Neetha also feel endeared to Anitha without knowing that she is their mother. Anitha makes ever new and better plans to protect her children from the dangers which befall them. Anitha now murdered the people who harmed the life of Neetha and Haritha. Anitha is caught in a cell for the crime of the Pavizham pavilion. Harilal reveals to his daughters the truth that Anitha is their mother. Anitha leaks video clips to several WhatsApp groups exposing the sexual harassment she faced in the cruel hands of Shyam and his gang. By the time Neetha exposes the mask of morality worn by certain individuals before the media. She speaks about the hardships she and her family had to overcome because of these two-faced people. This helped society to realise the justice of Anitha. Anitha gets rid of the Ravishankar case. Even though harilal and their family were ready to fight for Anitha in court she agreed to the court that she committed the crimes. Harilal decides to Adopt Yadhu by the request made by Anitha. Yadhu enters Harilal's life, Harilal and their family begin a new chapter in their life. Anitha hopes for having a life with her family behind jail bars.

Cast                                                                                  
 Mukundan as Harilal                                                              
 Sajin John as Young Harilal                                                           
 Lavanya Nair as Anitha/ Anita Thomas                                                           
 Aparna Ramesh as Young Anita Thomas
 Win Saagar as John Samuel
 Swathy Nithyanand as Haritha (Hari's Elder daughter)
 Veda Nanda as Young Haritha                                                          
 Nandana Anand as Neetha (Hair's younger daughter) 
 Roslin as Vimala Kumari (Hari's Mother)
 Karthika Kannan as Deepa Jyoti (Hari's Sister)                                           
 Aswathy as Dhanya (Deepa's daughter)                                                  
 Sabu Varghese as Rajeev Menon
 Adaaidha as Indumathi (Rajeev's wife, Haritha's mother in law)
 Maneesh Krishna as Sharath(Haritha's husband & Rajeev's son)
 Sreehari Thottunkal as Ajith (Rajeev's younger son)
 Uma Nair as Bindhuja Nair (Hari's late  fiancé)
 Sona/Sreelakshmi as Nivyamol(Bindhuja's daughter)
 Sarath Das as Ravi Shankar(Haritha's lover) 
 Sangeetha Rajendran as Anupama(Ravi's wife)
                                                                                Ajobsha as Jishin(Neetha's lover)
 Akash as son of Ravi and Anu
Pinkymol as daughter of Ravi and Anu

 Raji P Menon as Sr.Nirmala(Manager, Nirmala sathanam) 
 Nincy Xavier as Anjitha Menon(Neetha's collagemate)
 Prajusha as Susheela(Housemaid)                                                                                                                                                              
Priya Vishnu as Lakshmi(Housemaid) 

 Santhosh Krishna as C.I Sethunath
 Jishin Mohan as Shyam Lal
 Kalesh Kakode as Dheeraj(Jishin's friend) 
 Pinky Kannan as College student
 Prasad Shornur as Benny 
 Roy as CI Haridasan 
Kishore as DYSP Somasundaram
 Anooy krishnan as young Hari's roommate
Ajoobsha as Jishin(Neetha's lover)
 Rajeev Pala
Roy as Police

Guest appearance
 Anjusha as Neetha (ep117-151)
 Thejal as Anjitha (ep 80-

SONGS
 "നൊമ്പരപൂവിവൾ "  <ep-302> https://www.youtube.com/watch?v=-

External links
 https://www.thehindu.com/entertainment/binu-vellathooval-on-his-serial-bhramanam/article22813488.ece#!
 https://www.manoramaonline.com/music/music-news/title-song-of-the-new-novel-bhramanam-by-joysi-in-manorama-weekly.html
 

Malayalam-language television shows
Mazhavil Manorama original programming